The canton of Ladoix-Serrigny is an administrative division of the Côte-d'Or department, eastern France. It was created at the French canton reorganisation which came into effect in March 2015. Its seat is in Ladoix-Serrigny.

It consists of the following communes:
 
Aloxe-Corton
Auxey-Duresses
Bligny-lès-Beaune
Bouilland
Bouze-lès-Beaune
Chassagne-Montrachet
Chevigny-en-Valière
Chorey-les-Beaune
Combertault
Corberon
Corcelles-les-Arts
Corgengoux
Corpeau
Ébaty
Échevronne
Ladoix-Serrigny
Levernois
Marigny-lès-Reullée
Mavilly-Mandelot
Meloisey
Merceuil
Meursanges
Meursault
Montagny-lès-Beaune
Monthelie
Nantoux
Pernand-Vergelesses
Pommard
Puligny-Montrachet
Ruffey-lès-Beaune
Saint-Aubin
Sainte-Marie-la-Blanche
Saint-Romain
Santenay
Savigny-lès-Beaune
Tailly
Vignoles
Volnay

References

Cantons of Côte-d'Or